Pukepoto is a town in Northland, New Zealand. It lies south west of Kaitaia and north east of Ahipara. The Herekino Forest lies to the south east.

 is a cobalt blue pigment which can be found in clay rock.

Demographics
The SA1 area is part of the larger Tangonge statistical area.

The SA1 statistical area had a population of 165 at the 2018 New Zealand census, an increase of 27 people (19.6%) since the 2013 census, and an increase of 15 people (10.0%) since the 2006 census. There were 54 households, comprising 78 males and 84 females, giving a sex ratio of 0.93 males per female. The median age was 37.0 years (compared with 37.4 years nationally), with 39 people (23.6%) aged under 15 years, 30 (18.2%) aged 15 to 29, 69 (41.8%) aged 30 to 64, and 27 (16.4%) aged 65 or older.

Ethnicities were 34.5% European/Pākehā, 87.3% Māori, 5.5% Pacific peoples, and 1.8% other ethnicities. People may identify with more than one ethnicity.

Of those people who chose to answer the census's question about religious affiliation, 30.9% had no religion, 47.3% were Christian and 16.4% had Māori religious beliefs.

Of those at least 15 years old, 18 (14.3%) people had a bachelor or higher degree, and 39 (31.0%) people had no formal qualifications. The median income was $24,900, compared with $31,800 nationally. 6 people (4.8%) earned over $70,000 compared to 17.2% nationally. The employment status of those at least 15 was that 57 (45.2%) people were employed full-time, 15 (11.9%) were part-time, and 12 (9.5%) were unemployed.

Tangonge statistical area

Tangonge had a population of 1,134 at the 2018 New Zealand census, an increase of 3 people (0.3%) since the 2013 census, and an increase of 93 people (8.9%) since the 2006 census. There were 390 households, comprising 573 males and 558 females, giving a sex ratio of 1.03 males per female. The median age was 42.6 years (compared with 37.4 years nationally), with 252 people (22.2%) aged under 15 years, 174 (15.3%) aged 15 to 29, 519 (45.8%) aged 30 to 64, and 186 (16.4%) aged 65 or older.

Ethnicities were 62.7% European/Pākehā, 59.5% Māori, 4.2% Pacific peoples, 1.1% Asian, and 2.1% other ethnicities. People may identify with more than one ethnicity.

The percentage of people born overseas was 6.9, compared with 27.1% nationally.

Of those people who chose to answer the census's question about religious affiliation, 35.2% had no religion, 44.2% were Christian, 11.6% had Māori religious beliefs, 0.5% were Hindu and 1.3% had other religions.

Of those at least 15 years old, 108 (12.2%) people had a bachelor or higher degree, and 198 (22.4%) people had no formal qualifications. The median income was $26,700, compared with $31,800 nationally. 105 people (11.9%) earned over $70,000 compared to 17.2% nationally. The employment status of those at least 15 was that 411 (46.6%) people were employed full-time, 144 (16.3%) were part-time, and 42 (4.8%) were unemployed.

Marae

Pukepoto has two marae connected with the iwi (tribe) of Te Rarawa, maunga (mountain) of Taumatamahoe and repo/wai (water/wetland) of Tāngonge. Descendants of these marae identify with the ancestors Tumoana (captain of the Tinana waka), Tarutaru (who consolidated iwi Te Rarawa to revenge the death of Te Ripo), and Ngamotu (the daughter of Tarutaru).

Te Rarawa Marae and meeting house are affiliated with the hapū of Ngāti Te Ao and Te Uri o Hina.

Te Uri o Hina Marae and Hohourongo meeting house are affiliated with the hapū of Ngāti Te Ao, Tahāwai and Te Uri o Hina.

In October 2020, the Government committed $1,407,731 from the Provincial Growth Fund to upgrade Te Rarawa Marae, Te Uri o Hina Marae, and 7 other marae of Te Rarawa, creating 100 jobs.

Education 

Notes

External links
 Pukepoto School website

Far North District
Populated places in the Northland Region